Kris Davis (born 1980) is a Canadian jazz pianist and composer.

Early life
Davis was born in Vancouver in 1980 and grew up in Calgary, Alberta. She studied classical piano from the age of six and discovered jazz while a high school student. She transcribed performances by pianists Herbie Hancock and Keith Jarrett. She later reported that, "By the eighth grade I knew I wanted to be a jazz musician." She later majored in jazz piano at the University of Toronto.

Later life and career
Davis moved to New York in 2001. After her first album, Lifespan, was recorded in 2003, Davis says she "decided not to play chords anymore, just to play lines."

In 2009, Davis played solo concerts during a tour of Portugal. She followed this with a solo piano album, Aeriol Piano, which included sections for prepared piano. Her 2014 trio album Waiting for You to Grow was the follow-up to Good Citizen around five years earlier. On the change in style over the two releases, Davis said, "I had this concept to make [Good Citizen] almost like a pop record, where the tunes are really short [while] on the new record the tunes are much longer and explore multiple areas. I just wanted to write and not have any preconceived ideas". 

In 2013, Davis composed a suite for four bass clarinets, guitar, piano, organ and drums. In 2014, Davis had a six-day residency at The Stone in New York City and played in the UK for the first time. 

Davis completed her master's degree in composition at the City College of New York in 2014.

In 2015, Davis received a Doris Duke Impact Award. The following year, she performed John Zorn’s Bagatelles in both Quebec and New York City in a quartet with Mary Halvorson, Drew Gress, and Tyshawn Sorey. Her album Duopoly was included in 2016 best-of lists in publications including The New York Times, NPR Music, and PopMatters. Davis also founded the label Pyroclastic Records in 2016, and three years later she formed a nonprofit organization to support the label.

In 2019, Davis began work as instructor and assistant director at Berklee College of Music's Institute of Jazz and Gender Justice. Later that year, her record Diatom Ribbons was named jazz album of the year by The New York Times and the NPR Music Jazz Critics Poll.

The DownBeat Critics Poll named Davis 2017 Rising Star Pianist, 2018 Rising Star Artist, and 2020 winner of the piano category. In 2020, she was named Composer of the Year and Pianist of the Year by the Jazz Journalists Association. Davis' co-led album New Standards Vol. 1 won a Grammy Award for Best Jazz Instrumental Album.

Personal life
Davis was formerly married to the drummer Jeff Davis. She married guitarist Nate Radley in 2012.

Awards and honors
2016: DownBeat magazine: 25 for the Future
 2021: Doris Duke Performing Artist Award

Discography
An asterisk (*) indicates that the year is that of release.

As leader/co-leader

As sidewoman

References

1980 births
Davis, Kris
Canadian jazz pianists
Women jazz pianists
21st-century Canadian pianists
Thirsty Ear Recordings artists
Clean Feed Records artists
Fresh Sounds Records artists
Intakt Records artists
Tzadik Records artists
Grammy Award winners